Christoff is both a given name and a surname. Notable people with the name include:

Given name
Christoff Bryan (born 1996), Jamaican high jumper
Christoff De Bolle (born 1976), known by the mononym Christoff, Belgian Flemish schlager singer and radio presenter
Christoff Swanepoel, South African rugby league player 
Christoff Van Heerden (born 1985), South African racing cyclist

Middle name
Hans Christoff von Königsmarck (1605–1663), Swedish-German soldier

Surname
A. J. Christoff (born 1948), American football coach
Boris Christoff (1914–1993), Bulgarian opera singer 
Stefan Christoff, Canadian journalist, community organizer and musician
Steve Christoff (born 1958), American ice hockey player

See also
Christoff Cliff, rocky cliff forming Aytos Point on the coast of Bransfield Strait, eastern Livingston Island in the South Shetland Islands, Antarctica
Christoph
Christophe (disambiguation)
Christopher